The 58th Infantry Division (58-ya Pekhotnaya Diviziya) was an infantry formation of the Russian Imperial Army.

Organization
1st Brigade
229th Infantry Regiment
230th Infantry Regiment
2nd Brigade
231st Infantry Regiment
232nd Infantry Regiment

References

Infantry divisions of the Russian Empire